Ghats refer to two converging mountain ranges in south-eastern India, called the Eastern Ghats and Western Ghats, running along the eastern and western seaboards of the country.

The Eastern Ghats  parallel the Coromandel Coast. The chief rivers that cut through the mountains are the Godāvari, Krishna, and the Kaveri.

The Western Ghats extend from the southern portion of the valley of the River Tāpi along the Malabar Coast to Cape Comorin. In many sections, the range is separated only by a narrow strip of land from the coastline.

The region between the Eastern and Western Ghats is referred to as the Deccan Plateau. The east-sloping plateau is protected from the heavier rains by the two ranges, and has a dry season of between six and nine months.

References

Mountain ranges of India